Lodestar is an archaic word for a star that guides, especially the northern pole star (currently Polaris).

Lodestar may also refer to:

Art and entertainment 
 Lodestar Award for Best Young Adult Book, an award given annually at the World Science Fiction Convention
 Lodestar (band), an English band founded in 1996, or their debut album
 Lodestar (album), 2016 album by the English folk musician Shirley Collins
 "Lodestar" (Anderson), a 1973 short story by Poul Anderson
 LodeStar Festival, an annual music festival in Lode, Cambridgeshire, England
 Lodestar, a 2000 science fiction novel by Michael Flynn
 Lodestar, a character in the Ben 10 TV series
 Lodestar, a legendary island on the Grand Line in One Piece by Eiichiro Oda

Vehicles 
 GWR 4000 Class 4003 Lode Star, a British steam locomotive
 Lockheed Model 18 Lodestar, a passenger transport aircraft of the World War II era
 Lodestar (trimaran), a cruising trimaran sailboat design

Other uses 
 Lodestar (navigation), a star used in celestial navigation
 Lodestar method, a basis for calculating attorney's fees

See also 
 Loadstar (disambiguation)
 Lode (disambiguation)
 Lodestone